Freddie Potts (born 12 September 2003) is an English professional footballer who plays as a midfielder for West Ham United.

Career
Joining West Ham United at the age of six, Potts signed his first professional contract with the club in June 2021. On 9 December 2021, Potts made his senior debut for West Ham in a 1–0 loss against Dinamo Zagreb in the UEFA Europa League, coming on as an 87th minute substitute for Andriy Yarmolenko.

Personal life
Potts is the son of former West Ham United great Steve Potts and the brother of current Luton Town player Dan Potts.

Career statistics

Club

Notes

References

2003 births
Living people
Footballers from Barking, London
English footballers
English people of American descent
Association football midfielders
West Ham United F.C. players